Bahubali, a much revered figure among Jains, was the son of Rishabadeva (the first tirthankara of Jainism) and the brother of Bharata Chakravartin. He is said to have meditated motionless for a year in a standing posture (kayotsarga) and that during this time, climbing plants grew around his legs. After his one year of meditation, Bahubali is said to have attained omniscience (Kevala Gyana).
 
Bahubali's other names are Kammateswara, Gommateshwara because of the Gommateshwara statue dedicated to him.

Legends
The Adipurana, a 9th-century Sanskrit poem, deals with the ten lives of the first tirthankara, Rishabhanatha and his two sons Bharata and Bahubali. It was composed by Jinasena, a Digambara monk.

Family life

According to Jain texts, Bahubali was born to Rishabhanatha and Sunanda during the Ikshvaku dynasty in Ayodhya. He is said to have excelled in studying medicine, archery, floriculture, and the knowledge of precious gems. Bahubali had a son named Somakirti (also known as Mahabala). When Rishabhanatha decided to become a monk, he distributed his kingdom among his 100 sons. Bharata was gifted the kingdom of Vinita (Ayodhya) and Bahubali got the kingdom of Asmaka from South India, having Podanapur as its capital. After winning six divisions of earth in all directions (digvijaya), Bharata proceeded to his capital Ayodhyapuri with a huge army and divine chakra-ratna—spinning, disk-like super weapon with serrated edges. But the chakra-ratna stopped on its own at the entrance of Ayodhyapuri, signalling to the emperor that his 99 brothers have yet not submitted to his authority. Bharata's 98 brothers became Jain monks and submitted their kingdoms to him. Bahubali was endowed with the final and superior body of extraordinary sturdiness and strength (vajra-ṛṣabhanārācasaṃhanana) like Bharata. He hurled open defiance at the chakravartin and challenged him to a fight.

The ministers on both sides gave the following argument to prevent war; "The brothers themselves, cannot be killed by any means; they are in their last incarnations in transmigration, and possess bodies which no weapon may mortally wound in warfare! Let them fight out the issue by themselves in other ways." It was then decided that to settle the dispute, three kinds of contests between Bharata and Bahubali would be held. These were eye-fight (staring at each other), water-fight (jala-yuddha), and wrestling (malla-yuddha). Bahubali won all the three contests over his elder brother, Bharata.

Renunciation 

After the fight, Bahubali was filled with disgust at the world and developed a desire for renunciation. Bahubali abandoned all possessions-kingdom, clothes, ornaments-to become a monk and began meditating with great resolve to attain omniscience (Kevala Gyana).

He nanda is said to have meditated motionless in a standing posture (kayotsarga) for a year, during which time climbing plants grew around his legs. However, he was adamant and continued his practice unmindful of the vines, ants, and dust that enveloped his body. According to Jain text Ādi purāṇa, on the last day of Bahubali's one year long fast, Bharata came in all humility to Bahubali and worshiped him with veneration and respect. A painful regret that he had been the cause of his elder brother's humiliation had been disturbing Bahubali's meditation; this was dispersed when Bharata worshipped him. Bahubali was then able to destroy the four kinds of inimical karmas, including the knowledge obscuring karma, and he attained omniscience (kevala gyana). He was now revered as an omniscient being (Kevali). Bahubali finally attained liberation (moksha) at Mount Kailasa and became a pure, liberated soul (siddha). As per texts, he was one of the first Digambara monks to have attained moksha in the present half-cycle of time.(Avasarpiṇī).

Statues 
There are five monolithic statues of Bahubali measuring more than 6 m (20 feet) in height in Karnataka:

 17.4 m (57 feet) at Shravanabelagola in Hassan District in 981 AD
 12.8 m (42 feet) at Karkala in Udupi District in 1430 AD
 11.9 m (39 feet) at Dharmasthala in Dakshina Kannada District in 1973 AD
 10.7 m (35 feet) at Venur in Dakshina Kannada District in 1604 AD
 6 m (20 feet) at Gommatagiri in Mysore District in 12th Century AD

Shravanabelagola 

It was built in and around 981 A.D. and is one of the largest free-standing statues in the world. Shravanabelagola has remained a centre of pilgrimage (tirtha) for the Jains. The statue is bathed at an interval of every 12 years and this event is celebrated as Mahamastakabhisheka.

Karkala 

Karkala is known for its  monolithic statue of Gomateshwara Bahubali, which is believed to have been built around 1432 and is the second-tallest statue in the State. The statue is built on an elevated platform on top of a rocky hill. It was consecrated on 13 February 1432 by Veera Pandya Bhair Arasa Wodeyar, scion of the Bhair Arasa dynasty , feudatory of the Vijayanagar Ruler.

Dharmastala

Venur 

Venur is a small town in Dakshina Kannada district, Karnataka state, situated on the bank of the Gurupura River. Thimmanna Ajila built a  colossus of Gommateshwara there in 1604 AD. The statue at Venur is the shortest of the three Gommateshwaras within  around it. It stands in an enclosure on the same pattern as that of the statue at Shravanabelagola. The Kings of Ajila Dynasty ruled here from 1154 to 1786.

Gommatagiri 

Gommatagiri is an acclaimed Jain centre. The Jain centre attracts many pilgrims during the annual Mahamastakabhisheka in September. The statue at Gommatagiri is very similar to the  Gommateshwara statue in Shravanabelagola, except that it is smaller. Historians attribute the statue to an early Vijayanagar period.

Kumbhoj 

Kumbhoj is the name of an ancient town located in Kolhapur district, Maharashtra. The town is about eight kilometers from Hatkanangale, about twenty seven kilometers from Kolhapur.

Aretipur 
There is a -high statue of Bahubali at Aretipur, Near Kokrebellur Village of Madur Taluk Mandya district.

In 2016, the Archaeological Survey of India (ASI) excavated another -high statue of Bahubali made in the 3rd – 9th centuries in Aretipur.

In literature

The life-story of Bahubali has been discussed in many works.

Sanskrit 
 The Ādi purāṇa composed by Āchārya Jinasena. The Gommateshvara statue built by Chavundaraya was influenced by description in this book.
 Bahubali charitra written in the 9th century A.D.

Prakrit 
 Gommatesha-thudi, a religious hymn in praise to Bahubali, was composed by Nemichandra in 10th century CE.
 Gommatasa-sara, composed by Nemichandra, mentions the story of construction of the Gommateshwara statue by Chavundaraya.

Kannada 
 A 10th-century Kannada text based on the Sanskrit text was written by the poet Adikavi Pampa.
 Gommata-stuti is a poem dated 1180 was composed by a Jain poet named Boppanna (also known as Sujanottamsa), in praise of Bahubali.
 Karkala Gommatesvara Charitre, composed by Chadura Chandrama in 1686 CE, is poem describing the mahamastakabhisheka at Karkala.

Rajasthani 
 Bharateshwara Bahubali Ghora composed by Vajrasena Suri in 1168, is a poem with 48 verses describing the battle between Bharata and Bahubali.

Gujarati 
 Bharateshwara Bahubaliras composed by Shalibhadra Suri in 1184, is a poem with 203 stanzas describing the struggle of power between Bharata and Bahubali.

Images 

Pictured below are some of the images depicting Bahubali that are located at various places in India.

See also

God in Jainism
Jain cosmology
Jainism in Karnataka
Statue of Ahimsa
Bawangaja

References

Citations

Sources

External links
 Shri Bahubali

Jain saints
Solar dynasty
Ascetics
People in Jain texts
God in Jainism